This is a list of Australian intercolonial cricket matches. It lists only those first-class matches played between the various Australian colonies prior to Federation on 1 January 1901. Matches listed include composite team matches, such as Australian XI or Rest of Australia, played against either another composite team, or a colony.

Additional first-class matches (not listed here) were played and included matches between representative colonial teams and visiting overseas teams. Some of these matches are recorded as Test matches. See separate articles History of Test cricket from 1877 to 1883, History of Test cricket from 1884 to 1889 and History of Test cricket from 1890 to 1900 for more details.

List of matches

Key
 Sheffield Shield matches

See also
Sheffield Shield
Intercolonial cricket in Australia

References

Intercolonial cricket matches
Intercolonial cricket matches
Intercolonial cricket matches
Intercolonial cricket matches
Australian intercolonial